Pietro Lorenzini (born 17 March 1989 in Parma) is an Italian professional football player

He made his Serie A debut for Parma F.C. on 4 May 2008 in a game against Genoa C.F.C. when he came on as a substitute in the 83rd minute for Reginaldo.

External links
 

1989 births
Living people
Italian footballers
Italy youth international footballers
Serie A players
Parma Calcio 1913 players
Association football forwards